Coquitlam Mountain is a mountain located in northeast Coquitlam, British Columbia,  east of Coquitlam Lake and  north of Minnekhada Regional Park. The mountain is located at the head of Or Creek, completely within the Coquitlam watershed, and thus public access is forbidden by law. Mount Burke forms the southern ridge of Coquitlam Mountain.

The first recorded ascent of the mountain was in 1918 by P. James and D. Munday. The mountain's name was adopted on 3 May 1951, in association with the Coquitlam River.

Climate
The peak has a subarctic climate (Dfc).

References

Landforms of Coquitlam
Coquitlam
Coquitlam
New Westminster Land District